Water privatization in Brazil has been initiated in 1996. In 2008 private companies provided 7 million Brazilians - 4% of the urban population - in 10 of the country's 26 states with drinking water. The private sector holds 65 concession contracts in the states of São Paulo, Rio de Janeiro, Espírito Santo, Mato Grosso, Mato Grosso do Sul, Santa Catarina, Minas Gerais, Paraná, Pará and Amazonas. Private companies have committed to invest 4.5 billion reais (US$2.8 bn) in the sector.  The bulk of Brazil's population receives water and sanitation services from public municipal or state-level utilities (see Water supply and sanitation in Brazil).

Water privatization in Brazil has been relatively limited compared to other infrastructure sectors (power, transport, telecommunications). Compared to other Latin American countries, it has been more stable than in Argentina and Bolivia, but also less widespread than for example in Chile. As under all concession contracts, the infrastructure itself remains public, but is being operated by the private sector. Likewise, water resources themselves remain publicly owned. Most concession contracts have been awarded by municipalities. A lack of legal clarity as to the right of state governments to also award concession contracts has thwarted some efforts at water privatization, notably in the state of Rio de Janeiro.

Privatization in Brazil has taken place without having previously developed a comprehensive regulatory regime, as it was the case in Chile. The impact of water privatization on access, investment, service quality, water use, tariffs and efficiency has been assessed in a 2008 study with the support from various Brazilian stakeholders as part of a global multistakeholder dialogue on water and the private sector.

History

19th century

The first water privatizations in Brazil took place with English capital in Rio de Janeiro (1857) and São Paulo (1877) at the time of the post-colonial Empire under Pedro II of Brazil. Two decades later Campanhia Cantareira's services In São Paulo were deemed unsatisfactory and its contract was not renewed. Rio de Janeiro's services were similarly re-municipalized a few years later following "popular uprising."

Water privatization in the 1990s 

Privatization in Brazil was initiated under President Collor, through the Programa Nacional de Desestatização created in April 1990. In infrastructure, a major privatization program was initiated only in 1994, covering energy, transport, water supply and sanitation and telecommunications.

Between 1994 and 2000 a total of 38 private sector contracts (concessions, BOTs and service contracts) were signed, with investment commitments of more than US$2.5 billion. The nine first private concession agreements were in 1994-96 were all in the state of Sào Paulo (Limeira, Mairinque, Marília, Mineiros do Tietê, Ourinhos, Pereiras, São Carlos, Salto and Tuiuti).

To support the privatization effort, in 1997 the Workers Compensation Fund FGTS approved the use of 10% of the funds allocated for the Pró-Saneamento program to be directed towards privatization. In the same year, the Caixa Economica Federal, which was a main source of funding for water and sanitation, established a Special Water Works Concession Bureau (Eesan) to support private concessions. International financial institutions such as the World Bank supported private sector participation. For example, according to Miranda, following an unsuccessful 1999 attempt to privatize Compesa, the state water company of Pernambuco, it became extremely difficult to craft an acceptable loan proposal sans privatization.

In 1999, Brazil was viewed as "one of the world's largest concentrations of water and wastewater privatisation opportunities"; Thames Water opened an office in Rio de Janeiro and Azurix purchased AMX Acqua Management Inc. in order to get a "foot in the door."

However, the jurisdictional conflicts characterizing the regulatory environment in the water and sanitation sector complicated privatization efforts. For example, attempts to encourage private sector participation at the state level (in Bahia and Rio de Janeiro) have been challenged in the Supreme Federal Court by municipal governments. According to McNallen Brazil's system of civil law, with its limited adherence to precedent, is another obstacle to further privatization. It also affected concessions, planned for Espirito Santo and 
Petrolina. According to a report by Business News America, between 2002 and January 2007, no private sanitation contracts were signed. In part due to this legal uncertainty, a mayoral initiative to cancel a 40% tariff increase in Limeira requested by the concessionaire Suez was upheld by a federal court. The specific Brazilian context of water governance has produced "unprecedented wrangling" between national, state, and municipal officials.

As of 2000 only 1% municipalities had issued concession agreements to private companies. 71% of Brazil's municipalities delegated water and sewage services to state companies and 28% retained municipal provision.

21st century

A bill (Bill 4147/2001) which would have granted states the conceding authority for metropolitan areas failed to be passed due to opposition from trade groups. The primary controversy over the bill was about the interpretation of the Federal Constitution. But the discourse was also infused with rhetoric of the private sector as "inherently abusive in setting rates and unable or unwilling to invest to serve poorer areas adequately."
Finally another bill (Bill 5296/2005) was passed that clarified the role of the federal government in the sector, but failed to clarify the respective roles of states and municipalities. The law became effective in January 2007 as the sanitation law (law 11.445). Subsequently, seven new contracts for public-private partnerships (PPPs) were signed in 2007 alone, with Abcon expecting 15-20 more in 2008.

The sanitation law allows service contracts without launching a bidding process. It is being challenged by Brazil's Attorney General Antonio Fernando Souza, who is seeking an injunction from the Supreme Federal Court.

Results

So far no comprehensive study has assessed the results of private sector participation in water supply and sanitation in Brazil. Such a study is, however, currently underway with support from various Brazilian stakeholders as part of a global multistakeholder dialogue on water and the private sector. The study attempts to assess private sector participation using the following criteria:

improvements in operational performance
improvements in financial performance
increase in sector investments

In the absence of a completed comprehensive study this article draws on partial data and case studies quoted in the literature. The criteria used are increase in investment, increase in access, changes in efficiency, impact on water demand and health impacts.

Investment

Water and sanitation investment by public and private utilities has dropped by an average of 30% since 1998. Projections of future capital requirements vary. One source estimates a minimum need of US$60 billion over the next 20 years.

One justification for privatization has been that it would increase investments. For example, the Brazilian Association of Private Water and Sewage Operations (ABCON) promotes privatization primarily by arguing that it is the only way to acquire necessary infrastructure investments. Between 1990 and 2006, the Brazilian water and sewage sector produced 52 private projects, received US$3.069 billion in private capital.

In some concessions, actual investments remained below investment commitments, such as in concessions in Limeira, Manaus, Campo Grande. For example, in July 2000, Campo Grande, the capital of the Mato Grosso do Sul state granted a 30-year, US$217 million water and sewage concession to Aguas de Barcelona, a subsidiary of Suez-Lyonnaise des Eaux; by November 2001, planned investment was reduced 27.1% from the amount pledged.

Access

One justification for privatization has been that it would accelerate the increase of access to water and sanitation, in particular the poor. However, according to McNallen and Olivier, private cherry picking has had deleterious effects on the cross-subsidization which has made possible even the moderate provision of water and sanitation services to such users. According to the think tank PSIRU—which is financed by Public Services International, a global federation of public sector trade unions—in Manaus, Suez-Lyonnaise des Eaux backtracked on promises to expand access to 95% of the population immediately after receiving a 30-year concession in June 2000.

Efficiency 

There has apparently been no study analyzing changes in efficiency of privatized utilities in Brazil. However, Motta and Moreira have compared the efficiency of public and private utilities in Brazil at one point in time. Their cross-sectional statistical study examined the relative technical efficiency of public and private water companies in Brazil reveal that utilities with private sector participation are not much more efficient than public utilities. Faria speculates that the relatively low difference in efficiency in comparison to private sector participation in other countries can perhaps be explained by the relative weakness of the Brazilian regulatory regime. Public and private local operators also apparently face similar firm-specific costs. The differences between which are swamped by the stark difference between state and municipal firms. Ayres concludes that privatization is not a sufficient condition to improve efficiency, unless coupled with regulation to curtain anti-competitive practices and additional government stabilization.

Impact on water use 

Water tariff increases have occurred throughout Brazil in both public and private utilities, contributing to a decrease in water use.

According to Olivier, a 2004 tariff increase in the Manaus municipal water network by Aguas do Amazonas—a private operator and subsidiary of Suez Environment, which acquired a 30-year concession in June 2000—resulted in a substantial reduction in consumption, even steeper among low income users. According to PSIRU in another case poor water users in Paraná reverted to drinking rain water and other contaminated sources as a result of tariff increases by Vivendi's subsidiary, Sanepar.

Health impact 

There are no specific data on the health impact of water privatization in Brazil. According to Peres et al., privatization is likely to negatively affect the health of poorer populations if service gaps between rich and poor increase. This would contrast the experience of at least another country that has been studied in detail. According to a detailed 2002 study in Argentina, water privatization has had a positive impact on child mortality. It found that in the 1991-1997 period child mortality fell 5 to 7 percent more in areas that privatized compared to those that remained under public or cooperative management. It also found that the effect was largest in poorest areas (24%). The authors estimate that the main reason is the massive expansion of access to water, which was concentrated in poorer areas that did not receive services before private sector participation was introduced.

List of concession agreements

Opposition
Opposition to privatization has too often been characterized by "controversial and emotional debates," laced with "doubts, fears and prejudices" originating from generalized objections to globalization and neoliberalism. Similarly, according to Lemos and Oliveira many potentially beneficial public private partnerships (PPPs) have suffered from widespread mistrust—bred by "decades of broken promises"—and numerous "accounts of policy failure."

Many politically influential groups in Brazil harbor an "outright aversion to private capital participation" in water and other essential services. Politically, water privatization has often been conflated with conflicts over decentralization vis-à-vis the return of control from State water companies established under the military regime to re-municipalized companies. Thus, Brazilian water reform has remained "paralyzed by the controversy" because the municipal-state contest has too often been reduced to a question of which level of government should have the authority to grant concessions to private actors, rather than the authority to develop a coherent policy including both public and private elements.

Political parties that oppose privatization include the Workers' Party (PT) and the Socialism and Liberty Party (PSOL).

Alternatives
Emerging Brazilian alternatives have increasingly transcended the public-private debate by focusing on stakeholder participation and institutional cooperation.

Participatory models
Public water companies in Porto Alegre and Recife have developed "people-centered, participatory models" for improving water access. This has allowed them to position themselves as more than just being anti-privatization, but to develop a constructive alternative. Porto Alegre's DMAE in particular has become known for its participatory budgeting process. According to PSIRU, this has enabled Porto Alegre to "continually fight off privatization attempts" that were allegedly supported by the Brazilian Congress as well as international donors such as the Inter-American Development Bank (IADB) to the World Bank. The participatory budgeting process — which allows any public demand to be included in the following year's budget subject only to a popular vote and evaluation for technical feasibility — has become a model for direct democracy elsewhere in Brazil, and the world.

Sale of shares in the stock market 
São Paulo's state water and sewer company Sabesp, the largest water company in Latin America, has chosen a different path. Instead of awarding a private concession it has sold shares in the Brazilian stock market and even on the New York Stock Exchange. In addition, it obtained loans from the Inter-American Development Bank and the Japan Bank for International Cooperation. Rio de Janeiro's state government also plans to sell shares in its water and sewerage company, Nova Cedae, while still retaining majority control of the company, citing the example of Sabesp (four attempts to privatize the company in 1998 failed due to lack of agreement between the city and state governments). Shares of the state water and sewer companies of Minas Gerais, Copasa, and of Parana, Sanepar, are also traded on the stock exchange. In São Paulo, the state regulatory agency ARSESP, sets a rate of return for the utility - the weighted average cost of capital - which was set at 8.06% in 2011.

According to PSIRU such "civically active utilities" are alternatives to "desperation-induced privatization attempts" in Parana and Rio de Janeiro.

Reduction of private sector influence in existing agreements
In Paraná a 1998 concession agreement had given Dominó Holdings (formed by Vivendi, Brazilian bank Opportunity, and the Andrade Gutierrez group) control of the state water and sewer company SANEPAR. Recently, the Supreme Federal Court authorized the state government to increase its stake in SANEPAR, overturning an injunction granted by a lower court which had prevented the state from calling a general shareholders meeting.

See also 
 Water supply and sanitation in Brazil

Notes

References
Anuatti-Neto, Francisco, Barossi-Filho, Milton, de Carvalho, Antonio Gledson, and Macedo, Roberto. 2003. "Costs and benefits of privatization: evidence from Brazil." Inter-American Development Bank, Research Network Working Paper # R-455.
Arrretche, Marta T.S. 2001. "Water Supply and Sanitation." Ministério das Relações Exteriores.
Ayres, Ron. 1996. "The Economics of Privatization and Regulation: the Brazilian experience 1990-94." Review of Political Economy, 8(3): 303-323.
Barraqué, B., Formiga Johnsson, R.M., and Britto, A.L. 2007. "Sustainable water services and interaction with water resources in Europe and in Brazil." Hydrology and Earth System Sciences Discussions, 4: 3441-3467.
Balanyá, Belén, Brennan, Brid, Hoedeman, Olivier, Kishimoto, Satako, and Terhorst, Philipp (Eds.). 2005. Reclaiming Public Water: Achievements, Struggles and Visions from Around the World. Transnational Institute and Corporate Europe Observatory.
Casey, James F., Kahn, James R., and Rivas, Alexandre. 2006. "Willingness to pay for improved water service in Manaus, Amazonas, Brazil." Ecological Economics, 58: 365-372.
Clarke, George R.G., Kosec, Katrina, and Wallsten, Scott. 2004. "Has Private Participation in Water and Sewage Improved Coverage? Empirical Evidence form Latin America." World Bank Policy Research Working Paper 3445.
da Motta, Ronaldo Seroa, and Moreira, Ajax. 2006. "Efficiency and regulation in the sanitation sector in Brazil." Utilities Policy, 14: 185: 195.
do Amaral, Helena Kerr. 1996. "Brazilian Water Resource Policy in the Nineties." Instituto Cultural Minerva, Institute of Brazilian Business and Public Management Issues, George Washington University.
Faria, Ricardo Coelho, Souza, Geraldo da Silva, and Moreira, Tito Belchior. 2005. "Public Versus Private Water Utilities: Empirical Evidence for Brazilian Companies." Economics Bulletin, 8(2): 1-7.
Goldstein, Andrea. 1999. "Brazilian Privatization in International Perspective: The Rocky Path from State Capitalism to Regulatory Capitalism." In Industrial and Corporate Change. Oxford: Oxford University Press.
Hall, David, and Lobina, Emanuele. 2002. "Water privatization in Latin America, 2002." Public Services International Research Unit.
Hall, David, Lobina, Emanuele, and de la Motte, Robin. 2003. "Public solutions for private problems?" Public Services International Research Unit.
Lemos, Maria Carmen, and de Oliveira, João Lúcio Farias. 2005. "Water Reform across the State/Society Divide: The Case of Ceará, Brazil." Water Resources Development, 21(1): 133-147.
Lobina, Emanuele, and Hall, David. 2003. "Problems with private water concessions: A review of experiences in Latin America and other regions." Public Services International Research Unit.
Maltz, Hélio. 2005. "Porto Alegre's Water: Public and for All." In Reclaiming Public Water: Achievements, Struggles and Visions from Around the World. Balanyá, Belén, Brennan, Brid, Hoedeman, Olivier, Kishimoto, Satako, and Terhorst, Philipp (Eds.). Transnational Institute and Corporate Europe Observatory.
McNallen, Brendan. 2006. "Fixing the leaks in Brazil's water law: Encouraging sound private sector participation through legal and regulatory reform." Gonzaga Journal of International Law, 9: 147-199.
Ministry of Cities, National Department of Environmental Sanitation, Modernization Program for the Sanitation Sector – PMSS, Program Management Unit – UGP / INECON / Fundaçao Getulio Vargas Consortium: Verification of the private sector's participation in providing water supply and sanitary sewage services in Brazil - Executive Summary, São Paulo, October 30, 2008.
Miranda, Antonio. 2005. "Recife, Brazil: Building Up Water and Sanitation Services through Citizenship." In Reclaiming Public Water: Achievements, Struggles and Visions from Around the World. Balanyá, Belén, Brennan, Brid, Hoedeman, Olivier, Kishimoto, Satako, and Terhorst, Philipp (Eds.). Transnational Institute and Corporate Europe Observatory.
Olivier, Anne. 2006. "Water Tariff Increase in Manaus (Brazil): An Evaluation of The Impact on Households." Document de Travail, DT/2006-10.
Parlatore, Antonio Carlos. 1999. "Privatization of the Water Utility Sector in Brazil." Brazilian Development Bank. Essay #8.
Peres, Marco Aurélio, Fernandes, Liliane Simara, and Peres, Karen Glazer. 2004. "Inequality of water fluoridation in Southern Brazil—the inverse equity hypothesis revisited." Social Science & Medicine, 58: 1181-1189.
Prasad, Narren. 2007. "Privatization of Water: A Historical Perspective." Law, Environment and Development Journal, 3(2): 217.
Sabbioni, Guillermo. 2008. "Efficiency in the Brazilian sanitation sector." Utilities Policy, 16: 11-20.
Tupper, Henrique Cesar, and Resende, Marcelo. 2004. "Efficiency and regulatory issues in the Brazilian water and sewage sector: an empirical study." Utilities Policy, 12: 29-40.
Young, Robert A. 1998. "Water management options for Ceará and Piauí, Brazil in the prospect of global changes." Consultancy Paper for "Regional Water Use Scenarios in Northeast Brazil" for Center for Environmental Systems Research, University of Kassel.
World Bank. 2007. "Brazil Country Data." Private Participation in Infrastructure Database.

Brazil
Water supply and sanitation in Brazil
Privatization in Brazil